Line 900 is one of CFR's main lines in Romania having a total length of about . The main line, connecting Bucharest with the western city of Timișoara, passes through the important cities of Craiova, Drobeta-Turnu Severin and Lugoj.

There are five pairs of direct trains that run daily on the Bucharest North–Timișoara route; four of those trains belong to the state railway operator CFR Călători and one to the private operator . The journey takes between 9 hours and 49 minutes and 10 hours and 9 minutes.

Secondary lines

References

Railway lines in Romania
Standard gauge railways in Romania